The 2015 NCAA Division I men's basketball tournament involved 68 teams playing in a single-elimination tournament to determine the national champion of men's  NCAA Division I college basketball. The 77th edition of the tournament began on March 17, 2015, and concluded with the championship game on April 6 at Lucas Oil Stadium in Indianapolis. Duke defeated Wisconsin in the championship game, 68–63. Tyus Jones of Duke was the tournament's Most Outstanding Player.

Schedule and venues

The following are the sites selected to host each round of the 2015 tournament:

First Four
March 17 and 18
University of Dayton Arena, Dayton, Ohio (Host: University of Dayton)

Second and third rounds (round of 64 and round of 32)
March 19 and 21
Jacksonville Veterans Memorial Arena, Jacksonville, Florida (Hosts: Jacksonville University and the University of North Florida)
KFC Yum! Center, Louisville, Kentucky (Host: University of Louisville)
Consol Energy Center, Pittsburgh, Pennsylvania (Host: Duquesne University)
Moda Center, Portland, Oregon (Host: University of Oregon)
March 20 and 22
Time Warner Cable Arena, Charlotte, North Carolina  (Host: University of North Carolina at Charlotte)
Nationwide Arena, Columbus, Ohio (Host: Ohio State University)
CenturyLink Center Omaha, Omaha, Nebraska (Host: Creighton University)
KeyArena, Seattle, Washington (Host: University of Washington)

Regional semifinals and Finals (Sweet Sixteen and Elite Eight)
March 26 and 28
Midwest Regional, Quicken Loans Arena, Cleveland, Ohio (Host: Mid-American Conference and Cleveland State University)
West Regional, Staples Center, Los Angeles (Host: Pepperdine University)
March 27 and 29
East Regional, Carrier Dome, Syracuse, New York  (Host: Syracuse University)
South Regional, NRG Stadium, Houston, Texas (Hosts: Rice University, and University of Houston)
National semifinals and championship (Final Four and championship)
April 4 and 6
Lucas Oil Stadium, Indianapolis, Indiana (Hosts: IUPUI and the Horizon League)

Qualifying and selection procedure

Out of 333 eligible Division I teams, 68 participate in the tournament. Eighteen Division I teams were ineligible due to failing to meet APR requirements, self-imposed postseason bans, or reclassification from a lower division.

Of the 32 automatic bids, 31 were given to programs that won their conference tournaments. The Ivy League does not hold a tournament, and awards its bid to the team with the best regular-season record. However, whenever two or more teams are tied for the conference title, league rules call for a one-game playoff between the top two teams (or a series of such playoffs if more than two teams are tied), which occurred in this year. The remaining 36 bids were granted on an "at-large" basis, which were extended by the NCAA Selection Committee to the teams it deemed to be the best 36 teams that did not receive automatic bids.

Eight teams—the four lowest-seeded automatic qualifiers and the four lowest-seeded at-large teams—will play in the First Four (the successor to what had been popularly known as "play-in games" through the 2010 tournament). The winners of these games advance to the round of 64.

The Selection Committee will also seed the entire field from 1 to 68.

Automatic qualifiers
The following teams are automatic qualifiers for the 2015 NCAA field by virtue of winning their conference's automatic bid.

Tournament seeds

*See First Four

Since the 2004 NCAA Division I men's basketball tournament, the four 1 seeds have been seeded overall. This was the third time Kentucky was the overall top seed. The previous time was in the 2012 tournament. Duke was the overall 3 seed for the fourth time, previously advancing to the Final Four in two of those years: 2004 and 2010. Villanova was a 1 seed for the second time in school history; 2006 was the other time. This was the first 1 seed for Wisconsin.

Bracket
* – Denotes overtime period

First Four – Dayton, Ohio
The First Four games involved eight teams: the four overall lowest-ranked teams, and the four lowest-ranked at-large teams.

Midwest Regional – Cleveland, Ohio

Regional Final summary

Midwest Regional all-tournament team
Regional all-tournament team: Pat Connaughton, Notre Dame; Zach Auguste, Notre Dame; Willie Cauley-Stein, Kentucky; Andrew Harrison, Kentucky

Regional most outstanding player: Karl-Anthony Towns, Kentucky

West Regional – Los Angeles, California

Regional Final summary

West Regional all-tournament team
Regional all-tournament team: Frank Kaminsky, Wisconsin; Josh Gasser, Wisconsin; T. J. McConnell, Arizona; Rondae Hollis-Jefferson, Arizona

Regional most outstanding player: Sam Dekker, Wisconsin

East Regional – Syracuse, New York

Regional Final summary

East Regional all-tournament team
Regional all-tournament team: Denzel Valentine, Michigan State; Terry Rozier, Louisville; Montrezl Harrell, Louisville; Wayne Blackshear, Louisville

Regional most outstanding player: Travis Trice, Michigan State.

South Regional – Houston, Texas

Regional Final summary

South Regional all-tournament team
Regional all-tournament team: Matt Jones, Duke; Justise Winslow, Duke; Kyle Wiltjer, Gonzaga; Domantas Sabonis, Gonzaga

Regional most outstanding player: Tyus Jones, Duke

Final Four

During the Final Four round, regardless of the seeds of the participating teams, the champion of the top overall top seed's region plays (Kentucky's Midwest Region) against the champion of the fourth-ranked top seed's region (Wisconsin's West Region), and the champion of the second overall top seed's region plays (Michigan State's East Region) against the champion of the third-ranked top seed's region (Duke's South Region).

Lucas Oil Stadium – Indianapolis, Indiana

Game summaries

Final Four

National Championship

Final Four all-tournament team

Sam Dekker, Wisconsin
Frank Kaminsky, Wisconsin
Grayson Allen, Duke 
Justise Winslow, Duke
Tyus Jones, Duke, Most Outstanding Player

Tournament notes

Kentucky entered the tournament unbeaten. After 22 years without an unbeaten team in the tournament, following UNLV in 1991, this is the second consecutive tournament with an unbeaten team (after Wichita State in the previous). The Wildcats, by beating Cincinnati in the third round, set an NCAA men's record with 36 straight wins to start a season. They would win two more before Wisconsin upset them in the Final Four.

Defending national champion UConn did not qualify.

Kansas extended its streak of consecutive tournament appearances to 26 in a row.  They have made each NCAA Tournament dating back to 1990.  Kansas would qualify again the next two seasons to set the record for consecutive NCAA Tournament appearances formerly held by North Carolina (1975–2001).

Atlantic Sun Conference champion North Florida, Big West Conference champion UC Irvine, and Mid-American Conference champion Buffalo made their first respective appearances in the Division I tournament.

With both Buffalo and Albany winning their respective conferences and reaching the tournament, this is the first time two schools in the State University of New York system have reached the Division I tournament in the same year.

Two teams broke appearance droughts of over 20 years with their bids: Colonial Athletic Association champion Northeastern made its first NCAA appearance since 1991, and American champion Southern Methodist made its first NCAA appearance since 1993.

Harvard and Yale played a one-game playoff at the Palestra. Harvard won in dramatic fashion.

Dayton played a First Four game at their home arena, which is usually not allowed during the men's tournament. The NCAA selection committee indicated that putting Dayton in its home arena "falls within the context" of the committee's procedures.

For the first time since 1995, two 14 seeds recorded wins in the second round. On March 19, Georgia State defeated Baylor and UAB defeated Iowa State.

Of the sixteen games played on March 19, five were decided by one point, a single-day record.

For the first time since 2007 and the fourth time since the field expanded to 64 teams in 1985, all four 5 seeds won their Second Round games. This was also the first time since 2007 that there were four 4 vs. 5 matchups in the third round.

On March 20, all but one "chalk" team won their game (there was only one upset), compared to the four upsets the previous day.

Michigan State reached its seventh Final Four in the last 18 seasons—the best mark in the nation during that time span.

For the first time since 2009, multiple 1 seeds reached the Final Four.

For the first time since 2008, two 1 seeds reached the Championship, between Kansas and Memphis (later vacated by Memphis).

Wisconsin was in its first final since 1941, and lost; and Duke in its first final since 2010, and won.

The Wisconsin loss extended the Big Ten Conference's losing streak in National Championship games to six. As of 2015, Michigan State is the last Big Ten team to win a National Championship, having done so in 2000.

Upsets
Per the NCAA, "Upsets are defined as when the winner of the game was seeded five or more places lower than the team it defeated." The 2015 tournament saw a total of 7 upsets; 4 of them were in the first round and 3 of them were in the second round.

Record by conference

The R64, R32, S16, E8, F4, CG, and NC columns indicate how many teams from each conference were in the round of 64 (second round), round of 32 (third round), Sweet 16, Elite Eight, Final Four, championship game, and national champion, respectively.
The "Record" column includes wins in the First Four for Atlantic 10, MEAC, NEC, and SEC.
The Atlantic Sun and MAAC each had one representative, eliminated in the First Four with a record of 0–1.
The America East, Big Sky, Big South, Big West, Colonial, Horizon League, Ivy, MAC, OVC, Patriot League, Southern, Southland, SWAC, Summit, and WAC each had one representative, eliminated in the second round with a record of 0–1.

Media coverage

Story headlines
The round of 64 started off with multiple upsets with majority of the upsets coming out of the Big 12 conference. The television coverages of CBS and Turner had one of the best overall ratings on March 20, 2015. According to Nielsen estimates, exclusive coverage of the opening full round of the NCAA Division I Men's Basketball Championship across TBS, CBS, TNT and truTV averaged a 6.6 overnight household rating/14 share — up 10% from last year and the highest since the tournament expanded to four telecast windows for the entire day.

One of the upsets that happened was UAB upsetting No. 3 seed Iowa State 60-59. The 19-15 UAB Blazers qualified for the NCAA tournament for the first time since 2011 by winning three-straight to earn the Conference USA tournament title and an automatic bid.

Baylor, a No. 3 seed, took on No. 14 seed Georgia State and with less than three minutes to go, Georgia State staged a 13-0 run to beat Baylor. "The comeback was punctuated with a three by R. J. Hunter, son of stool-bound coach Ron Hunter, that has already produced a moment sure to go down in history – the elder Hunter, who already tore his Achilles celebrating the team's Sun Belt conference tourney victory, fell off that stool in ecstasy after his son's three dropped to give the Panthers the 57-56 lead that would be the final margin," according to Andy Hutchins.

However, the most talked about headline was UCLA not only making the tournament despite a poor performance in the Pac-12, but also with a call with 13 seconds left when UCLA took on SMU and coach Larry Brown. A late second goaltending that cost SMU the game sparked a lot of attention in sports media and social media. The Bruins moved on to play UAB in the round of 32. Both teams played each other earlier in the season, when UCLA beat the Blazers 88-76 in the Bahamas back in November. Sam Vecenie a CBS writer, was quoted saying, "Funny part of that story? It was the last-place game of the Battle 4 Atlantis tournament. Cool to see how these two teams have turned around their season."

Television
The year 2015 marked the fifth year of a 14-year partnership between CBS and Turner cable networks TBS, TNT, and truTV to cover the entire tournament under the NCAA March Madness banner. TBS aired the Final Four for the second consecutive year.

First Four – truTV
Second and third rounds – CBS, TBS, TNT, and truTV
Regional semifinals and Finals (Sweet Sixteen and Elite Eight) – CBS and TBS/2015 NCAA Division II men's basketball tournament National Championship – CBS
National semifinals (Final Four) – TBS, TNT, truTV
TBS provided traditional coverage; TNT and truTV each gave team-specific broadcasts.
National Championship – CBS
Reese's College Basketball All Star Game– CBS

Studio hosts
Greg Gumbel (New York City and Indianapolis) – Second Round, Third round, Regionals, Final Four and National Championship Game
Ernie Johnson Jr. (New York City, Atlanta and Indianapolis) – Second Round, Third round, Regional Semi-Finals, Final Four and National Championship Game
Matt Winer (Atlanta) – First Four, second round and third round

Studio analysts
Charles Barkley (New York City and Indianapolis) – Second Round, Third round, Regionals, Final Four and National Championship Game
Mateen Cleaves (Atlanta) – First Four, second round and third round
Seth Davis (Atlanta and Indianapolis) – First Four, second round, Third round, Regional Semi-Finals, Final Four and National Championship Game
Jamie Dixon (Atlanta) – Second Round
Doug Gottlieb (New York City) – Regionals
Anthony Grant (Atlanta) – Second Round
Ron Hunter (Atlanta) – Regional Semi-Finals
Clark Kellogg (New York City and Indianapolis) – Second Round, Third round, Regionals, Final Four and National Championship Game
Reggie Miller (Indianapolis) – Final Four and National Championship Game
Wally Szczerbiak (Atlanta and New York City) – First Four and Second Round
Kenny Smith (New York City and Indianapolis) – Second Round, Third round, Regionals, Final Four and National Championship Game
Steve Smith (Atlanta and Indianapolis) – Regional Semi-Finals, Final Four and National Championship Game
Buzz Williams (Atlanta) – Second Round

Commentary teams
Jim Nantz/Bill Raftery/Grant Hill/Tracy Wolfson – First and Second Rounds at Charlotte, North Carolina; South Regional at Houston, Texas; Final Four and National Championship at Indianapolis, Indiana
Marv Albert or Brian Anderson/Chris Webber/Len Elmore/Lewis Johnson – First and Second Rounds at Omaha, Nebraska; Midwest Regional at Cleveland, Ohio
Anderson called the Midwest Regional final after Albert withdrew from the game due to illness.
Verne Lundquist/Jim Spanarkel/Allie LaForce – First and Second Rounds at Louisville, Kentucky; East Regional at Syracuse, New York
Kevin Harlan/Reggie Miller/Dan Bonner/Rachel Nichols – First and Second Rounds at Portland, Oregon; West Regional at Los Angeles, California
Ian Eagle/Doug Gottlieb/Evan Washburn – First Four at Dayton, Ohio; First and Second Rounds at Columbus, Ohio
Brian Anderson/Steve Smith/Lewis Johnson (First Four)/Dana Jacobson (Pittsburgh) – First Four at Dayton, Ohio; First and Second Rounds at Pittsburgh, Pennsylvania
Spero Dedes/Mike Gminski/Jaime Maggio – First and Second Rounds at Seattle, Washington
Andrew Catalon/Steve Lappas/Jamie Erdahl – First and Second Rounds at Jacksonville, Florida

Sources:

Team Stream broadcasts
For the second consecutive year, the semifinals were exclusive to cable, with TBS airing the standard broadcast with Nantz, Raftery, Hill, and Wolfson. TNT and TruTV aired Team Stream by Bleacher Report broadcasts (known as Teamcasts during the 2014 tournament), which featured localized commentary and features with specific focuses on each participating team.
Tom Werme/Alaa Abdelnaby/Chris Spatola – Duke Team Stream on TNT
Brian Anderson/Mateen Cleaves/Shireen Saski – Michigan State Team Stream on truTV
Dave Baker/Rex Chapman/Michael Eaves – Kentucky Team Stream on TNT
Wayne Larrivee/Mike Kelley/Phil Dawson – Wisconsin Team Stream on truTV

Radio
Westwood One had exclusive radio rights to the entire tournament.

First Four
Brandon Gaudin and Alaa Abdelnaby – at Dayton, Ohio

Second and Third rounds
Tom McCarthy and Donny Marshall – Jacksonville, Florida
John Sadak and Bill Frieder – Louisville, Kentucky
Scott Graham and Kevin Grevey – Pittsburgh, Pennsylvania
Wayne Larrivee and Mike Montgomery – Portland, Oregon
Gary Cohen and Kelly Tripucka – Charlotte, North Carolina
Dave Sims and Jim Jackson – Columbus, Ohio
Kevin Kugler and Will Perdue – Omaha, Nebraska
Kevin Calabro and P. J. Carlesimo – Seattle, Washington

Regionals
Ian Eagle and P. J. Carlesimo – East Regional at Syracuse, New York
Gary Cohen and Bill Frieder – Midwest Regional at Cleveland, Ohio
Kevin Kugler and Will Perdue – South Regional at Houston, Texas
Wayne Larrivee and Donny Marshall – West Regional at Los Angeles, California

Final Four
Kevin Kugler, Clark Kellogg, and Jim Gray – Indianapolis, Indiana

See also
 2015 NCAA Division II men's basketball tournament
 2015 NCAA Division III men's basketball tournament
 2015 NCAA Division I women's basketball tournament
 2015 NCAA Division II women's basketball tournament
 2015 NCAA Division III women's basketball tournament
 2015 National Invitation Tournament
 2015 Women's National Invitation Tournament
 2015 NAIA Division I men's basketball tournament
 2015 NAIA Division II men's basketball tournament
 2015 NAIA Division I women's basketball tournament
 2015 NAIA Division II women's basketball tournament
 2015 College Basketball Invitational
 2015 CollegeInsider.com Postseason Tournament

References

Ncaa tournament
NCAA Division I men's basketball tournament
NCAA Division I men's basketball tournament
2010s in Indianapolis
2010s in Cleveland
NCAA Division I men's basketball tournament
Basketball competitions in Indianapolis
Basketball competitions in Houston
NCAA Division I Men's Basketball
NCAA Division I men's basketball tournament
NCAA Division I men's basketball tournament
NCAA Division I men's basketball tournament
Basketball competitions in Cleveland
Basketball competitions in Syracuse, New York
Basketball competitions in Los Angeles